, there were 3,130 electric vehicles registered in Kansas, equivalent to 0.12% of all vehicles in the state.

Government policy
, the state government charges a $100 registration fee for electric vehicles, compared to a standard fee of $30–40.

Charging stations
, there were 487 public charging station locations with 1,013 charging ports in Kansas.

The Infrastructure Investment and Jobs Act, signed into law in November 2021, allocates  to charging stations in Kansas.

, the state government recognizes I-35 and I-70 as potential charging corridors, with plans for charging stations to be located every .

By region

Kansas City
In July 2022, Panasonic announced plans to build a  electric vehicle battery manufacturing plant in De Soto, which would be the largest in the state.

Lawrence
, there were 26 public charging stations in Lawrence.

Manhattan
, there were 19 public charging stations in Manhattan.

Wichita
Wichita introduced the first electric bus to its municipal fleet in January 2020, becoming the first local government in Kansas to do so.

References

Kansas
Road transportation in Kansas